Presidential elections, the first after the independence of 1979, were held in Kiribati on 4 May 1982. The result was a victory for incumbent Ieremia Tabai, who won 48.7% of the vote. Voter turnout was 82.4%.

Results

References

Kiribati
1982 in Kiribati
Presidential elections in Kiribati
Non-partisan elections
Election and referendum articles with incomplete results